Piperylene or 1,3-pentadiene is an organic compound with the formula .  It is a volatile, flammable hydrocarbon.  It is one of the five positional isomers of pentadiene.

Reactions and occurrence
Piperylene is a typical diene.  It forms a sulfolene upon treatment with sulfur dioxide.

Piperylene is the product of the decarboxylation of sorbic acid, a common anti-mold agent.

Piperylene is obtained as a byproduct of ethylene production from crude oil, combustion of biomass, waste incineration and exhaust gases. It is used as a monomer in the manufacturing of plastics, adhesives and resins.

See also
 Butadiene
 Cyclopentadiene
 Isoprene

References

Alkadienes
Conjugated dienes